Mait Patrail (born 11 April 1988) is an Estonian handball player for ASV Hamm-Westfalen and the Estonian national team.

References

1988 births
Living people
People from Põlva
Estonian expatriate sportspeople in Germany
Estonian male handball players
Handball-Bundesliga players
Rhein-Neckar Löwen players
Expatriate handball players
Estonian expatriate sportspeople in Qatar